Clay Township is a township in Huntingdon County, Pennsylvania, United States. The population was 874 at the 2020 census.

General information
ZIP Codes: 17253, 17264
Area Code: 814
Local Phone Exchanges: 447, 448
School District: Southern Huntingdon County School District

Geography

Demographics

At the 2000 census there were 920 people in 370 households, including 283 families, in the township.  The population density was 32.6 people per square mile (12.6/km).  There were 494 housing units at an average density of 17.5/sq mi (6.8/km).  The racial makeup of the township was 99.02% White, 0.11% African American, 0.11% Asian, 0.11% from other races, and 0.65% from two or more races.
There were 370 households, 31.6% had children under the age of 18 living with them, 66.5% were married couples living together, 5.7% had a female householder with no husband present, and 23.5% were non-families. 20.0% of households were made up of individuals, and 10.3% were one person aged 65 or older.  The average household size was 2.49 and the average family size was 2.85.

The age distribution was 23.3% under the age of 18, 6.5% from 18 to 24, 26.5% from 25 to 44, 27.2% from 45 to 64, and 16.5% 65 or older.  The median age was 40 years. For every 100 females, there were 99.1 males.  For every 100 females age 18 and over, there were 101.7 males.

The median household income was $30,966 and the median family income  was $34,250. Males had a median income of $31,992 versus $18,750 for females. The per capita income for the township was $15,282.  About 5.6% of families and 9.2% of the population were below the poverty line, including 11.5% of those under age 18 and 9.1% of those age 65 or over.

References

Townships in Huntingdon County, Pennsylvania
Townships in Pennsylvania